Windsor, Slough, Eton and Hounslow Athletic Club is an athletics club based in Eton, Berkshire, England.  It is based at the Thames Valley Athletics Centre in Eton, Berkshire. The club competes in the British Athletics League Division 1, UK Women's Athletic League Premier as well as the Southern Athletics League.

History
Windsor, Slough, Eton and Hounslow Athletic Club was founded in the 1880s.

Honours
Senior Women:
 UK Women's Athletic League
 First Place: 1998
 Second Place: 1997, 2001, 2002, 2012, 2013
 Third Place: 1999, 2000, 2004, 2009, 2010, 2011

Notable athletes

Olympians

Kit 
The club kit is a light blue vest or crop top with two horizontal yellow stripes around the middle of the torso.

References

External links
 Official club website
 Thames Valley Athletics Centre

Athletics clubs in England